Beacon Institute for Rivers and Estuaries, Clarkson University, with offices in City of Beacon and Troy, New York, is a 501(c)(3) not-for-profit environmental research organization focusing on real-time monitoring of river ecosystems. The institute's mission is to "create and maintain a global center for scientific and technological innovation that advances research, education and public policy regarding rivers and estuaries."

In 2011, Beacon Institute for Rivers and Estuaries and Clarkson University announced an expansion of their education and operational partnership for commercialization of new real-time river monitoring sensor technology, academic programs and public policy solutions based on real-time data to protect waterways. Clarkson University Business School Dean Timothy Sugrue, a West Point graduate, is the institute's President and Chief Executive Officer, with responsibility for R&D oversight and commercial partnership development. With the new alliance, the institute's Founding Director, Hudson River environmentalist John Cronin, joined Clarkson's faculty as a Beacon Institute Fellow. Cronin also serves as Senior Fellow for Environmental Affairs at Pace University's Academy for the Environment.

In 2008, Clarkson University's James S. Bonner and a team of its researchers joined the River and Estuary Observatory Network (REON) collaboration started by Beacon Institute and IBM. Together, the partners have established a first-of-its-kind real-time environmental monitoring network for rivers and estuaries that seeks to allow continuous monitoring of physical, chemical and biological data from points in New York's Hudson, Mohawk and St. Lawrence Rivers via an integrated network of sensors, robotics, mobile monitoring and computational technology deployed in the rivers.

External links
Beacon Institute for Rivers and Estuaries, Clarkson University

Ecology organizations
Beacon, New York
Hudson River